Egypt competed at the 1920 Summer Olympics in Antwerp, Belgium.

Athletics

Two athletes represented Egypt in 1920. It was the nation's debut in athletics. Neither of the two athletes were able to advance past the initial round in any of their events.

Ranks given are within the heat.

Fencing

A single fencer represented Egypt in 1920. It was the nation's debut in the sport. Hassanein was eliminated in the quarterfinal round of each of his two events.

Ranks given are within the group.

Football

Egypt competed in the Olympic football tournament for the first time. The team lost their first match, against Italy, before beating Yugoslavia in the consolation matches.

 Team Roster
Kamel Taha
Mohamed El-Sayed
Abdel Salam Hamdy
Riad Shawki
Ali El-Hassany
Gamil Osman
Tewfik Abdullah
Hussein Hegazi
Hassan Ali Allouba
Sayed Abaza
Zaki Osman
Reserve: Khalil Hosni
Reserve: Mohamed Gabr
Reserve: Mahmoud S. Mokhtar
Reserve: Abbas Safwat

 First round

 Consolation match

Final rank 6th

Gymnastics

Two gymnasts represented Egypt in 1920. It was the nation's debut in the sport. The two Egyptian gymnasts finished in the last two places of the individual all-around.

Artistic gymnastics

Weightlifting

A single weightlifter represented Egypt in 1920. It was the nation's debut in the sport. Samy competed in the middleweight category, but did not finish the competition.

Wrestling

A single wrestler competed for Egypt in 1920. It was the nation's debut in the sport. Rahmy competed in the Greco-Roman lightweight and the freestyle middleweight, losing his only match in each competition.

Freestyle

Greco-Roman

References

 
 

Nations at the 1920 Summer Olympics
1920
Olympics